The Ministry of Endowments and Guidance (Arabic: وزارة الأوقاف والإرشاد) is a cabinet ministry of Yemen.

List of ministers 

 Mohamed Ahmed Shabiba (18 December 2020 – present)
 Ahmed Zabin Atayah (18 September 2016 – 17 December 2020)

See also 
Cabinet of Yemen 
Politics of Yemen

References 

Government ministries of Yemen